Shaimaa El-Gammal (born 30 January 1980) is an Egyptian fencer. She competed in the women's foil events at the 2000, 2004, 2008 and 2012 Summer Olympics.

Her sister, Eman El Gammal was also an Olympic fencer 2008 Summer Olympics and 2012 Summer Olympics.

References

External links
 

1980 births
Living people
Egyptian female foil fencers
Olympic fencers of Egypt
Fencers at the 2000 Summer Olympics
Fencers at the 2004 Summer Olympics
Fencers at the 2008 Summer Olympics
Fencers at the 2012 Summer Olympics
20th-century Egyptian women
21st-century Egyptian women